Niklas Rainer (born 9 May 1983) is a Swedish alpine skier and coach.

References

External links
Profile at FIS-ski.com

1983 births
Living people
Swedish male alpine skiers
21st-century Swedish people